As a type of binding knot, the jamming knot is good for constricting a bundle of objects such as sticks or brush.  It is basically a taut-line hitch but the initial two wraps are on the outside of the working line rather than on the inside, and finished off with one wrap on the inside.  Thus the knot holds tension towards the inside of the loop rather than the standing end of the rope as with the taut-line – turning a tension knot into a constricting knot.  After the knot is tied, the knot is held with one hand, the standing end is pulled tight, and the knot should hold fast.  This knot, as with the taut-line, can be difficult or impossible to tie on slick or particularly stiff rope.

See also
Knot jamming